Gwangju Songjeong station (formerly Songjeong-ri station) is a station of Gwangju Metro Line 1 in Songjeong-dong, Gwangsan District, Gwangju, South Korea. The station is unrelated to the GwangjuSongjeong Station of Korail.

Station layout

Exits

External links
  Cyber station information from Gwangju Metropolitan Rapid Transit Corporation
  Cyber station information from Gwangju Metropolitan Rapid Transit Corporation

Gwangju Metro stations
Gwangsan District
Railway stations opened in 2008